Hyophorbe is a genus of five known species of flowering plants in the family Arecaceae, native to the Mascarene Islands in the Indian Ocean. All five species can attain heights of over 6 meters, and two of the species develop swollen trunks that have made them popular as ornamentals, but all of them are endangered in the wild.

It contains the following species:
 Hyophorbe amaricaulis Mart. – Mauritius, 1 individual left
 Hyophorbe indica Gaertn. (palmiste poison) – Réunion
 Hyophorbe lagenicaulis (L.H.Bailey) H.E.Moore (bottle palm) – Mauritius
 Hyophorbe vaughanii L.H.Bailey – Mauritius
 Hyophorbe verschaffeltii H.Wendl. (palmiste marron) – Rodrigues Island

Species gallery

References

 
Endemic flora of the Mascarene Islands
Arecaceae genera
Afrotropical realm flora
Taxonomy articles created by Polbot